Centrostephanus longispinus rubricingulus is a subspecies of sea urchins of the Family Diadematidae. Their armour is covered with spines. C. l. rubricingulus was first scientifically described in 1921 by Hubert Lyman Clark.

See also 
 Centrostephanus nitidus
 Centrostephanus sylviae

References 

Diadematidae
Animals described in 1921